Asura tricolor is a moth of the family Erebidae. It was described by Wileman in 1910. It is found in Taiwan and China.

References

Taiwan Moth Information Center

Moths described in 1910
tricolor
Moths of Taiwan
Erebid_moths_of_Asia